Juan Manuel Rocha Piedra (born 27 June 1960) is a Mexican politician affiliated with the PRI. As of 2013 he served as Deputy of the LXII Legislature of the Mexican Congress representing Nayarit.

References

1960 births
Living people
Politicians from Nayarit
Members of the Chamber of Deputies (Mexico)
Institutional Revolutionary Party politicians
21st-century Mexican politicians